Babi hong is a Chinese Indonesian pork belly dish possibly of Hakka origin. The samcan or pork belly is boiled or braised, fried and steamed in numbers of Chinese seasonings and sauces.

Babi hong is often offered in Chinese Indonesian restaurants, especially in Chinese towns in Indonesian cities. Traditionally this dish is considered as a special dish to be served to guests and family during special occasion such as imlek (Chinese New Year).

Babi hong is quite similar to other Chinese Indonesian pork dish – babi kecap (pork braised in soy sauce), although babi kecap is a much simpler dish. It is quite similar – possibly related to Hakka dish kiu nyuk and mainland Chinese pork belly dish hong shao rou.

Ingredients
The main ingredient is samcan or pork belly meat, hioko or shiitake mushroom, sayur asin or dried salted mustard greens, with garlic, ginger, salt, sugar, pepper, and ngohiong or five-spice powder. For seasoning this dish uses three types of soy sauces; common salty soy sauce, kecap manis (sweet soy sauce), and kecap jamur (black mushroom soy sauce). It also uses angciu (Chinese red cooking wine) and oyster sauce. The pork belly actually must undergone three stages or three types of cooking methods; including boiling or braising, frying in oil, and steaming.

See also
 Babi kecap
 Babi panggang
 Sekba

References

External links
 
 Home made babi hong recipe in Youtube
 Simplified babi hong recipe in Youtube

Indonesian Chinese cuisine
Pork dishes